In mathematics, a unit sphere is simply a sphere of radius one around a given center. More generally, it is the set of points of distance 1 from a fixed central point, where different norms can be used as general notions of "distance". A unit ball is the closed set of points of distance less than or equal to 1 from a fixed central point. Usually the center is at the origin of the space, so one speaks of "the unit ball" or "the unit sphere".
Special cases are the unit circle and the unit disk.

The importance of the unit sphere is that any sphere can be transformed to a unit sphere by a combination of translation and scaling.  In this way the properties of spheres in general can be reduced to the study of the unit sphere.

Unit spheres and balls in Euclidean space

In Euclidean space of n dimensions, the -dimensional unit sphere is the set of all points  which satisfy the equation

The n-dimensional open unit ball is the set of all points satisfying the inequality

and the n-dimensional closed unit ball is the set of all points satisfying the inequality

General area and volume formulas

The classical equation of a unit sphere is that of the ellipsoid with a radius of 1 and no alterations to the x-, y-, or z- axes:

The volume of the unit ball in n-dimensional Euclidean space, and the surface area of the unit sphere, appear in many important formulas of analysis.  The volume of the unit ball in n dimensions, which we denote Vn, can be expressed by making use of the gamma function.  It is

where n!! is the double factorial.

The hypervolume of the (n−1)-dimensional unit sphere (i.e., the "area" of the boundary of the n-dimensional unit ball), which we denote An−1, can be expressed as

For example,  is the "area" of the boundary of the unit ball , which simply counts the two points. Then  is the "area" of the boundary of the unit disc, which is the circumference of the unit circle.  is the area of the boundary of the unit ball , which is the surface area of the unit sphere .

where the decimal expanded values for n ≥ 2 are rounded to the displayed precision.

Recursion

The An values satisfy the recursion:

The Vn values satisfy the recursion:

Non-negative real-valued dimensions

Other radii

The surface area of an (n−1)-dimensional sphere with radius r is An−1 rn−1 and the volume of an n-dimensional ball with radius r is Vn rn.

Unit balls in normed vector spaces

The open unit ball of a normed vector space  with the norm  is given by

It is the topological interior of the closed unit ball of (V,||·||):

The latter is the disjoint union of the former and their common border, the unit sphere of (V,||·||):

The 'shape' of the unit ball is entirely dependent on the chosen norm; it may well have 'corners', and for example may look like [−1,1]n, in the case of the max-norm in Rn. One obtains a naturally round ball as the unit ball pertaining to the usual Hilbert space norm, based in the finite-dimensional case on the Euclidean distance; its boundary is what is usually meant by the unit sphere.

Let   Define the usual -norm for p ≥ 1 as:

Then  is the usual Hilbert space norm.
 is called the Hamming norm, or -norm.
The condition p ≥ 1 is necessary in the definition of the  norm, as the unit ball in any normed space must be convex as a consequence of the triangle inequality.
Let  denote the max-norm or -norm of x.

Note that for the one-dimensional circumferences  of the two-dimensional unit balls, we have:

 is the minimum value.

 is the maximum value.

Generalizations

Metric spaces
All three of the above definitions can be straightforwardly generalized to a metric space, with respect to a chosen origin. However, topological considerations (interior, closure, border) need not apply in the same way (e.g., in ultrametric spaces, all of the three are simultaneously open and closed sets), and the unit sphere may even be empty in some metric spaces.

Quadratic forms
If V is a linear space with a real quadratic form F:V → R, then { p ∈ V : F(p) = 1 } may be called the unit sphere or unit quasi-sphere of V. For example, the quadratic form , when set equal to one, produces the unit hyperbola which plays the role of the "unit circle" in the plane of split-complex numbers. Similarly, the quadratic form x2 yields a pair of lines for the unit sphere in the dual number plane.

See also
Ball
Hypersphere
Sphere
Superellipse
Unit circle
Unit disk
Unit sphere bundle
Unit square

Notes and references

 Mahlon M. Day (1958) Normed Linear Spaces, page 24, Springer-Verlag.
. Reviewed in Newsletter of the European Mathematical Society 64 (June 2007), p. 57. This book is organized as a list of distances of many types, each with a brief description.

External links 

 

Functional analysis
1 (number)
Spheres

es:1-esfera